A chhajja is an overhanging eave or roof covering found in Indian architecture. It is characterised with large support brackets with different artistic designs. Variation is also seen in its size depending on the importance of the building on which it features or the choice of the designer.

Its function is similar to that of other overhangs or eaves in that it protects and adorns entrances, arches and windows from the outside elements. Some styles of roof can be considered large chhajja as well.

History
Although there is no conclusive agreement on when the chhajja emerged as an architectural element, it can be traced back to before the rise of the Mughal Empire in India. However, much of its popular use seems to be during this time.

The original inspiration of the chhajja and much of the other Indian architectural elements with which it is commonly not seen can be traced back to building design from older periods, such as that of bamboo and thatch village huts that can still be found today. The elements of these buildings may have simply been built in stone and made to have a more dignified look that can be seen in many buildings today. This works especially well to counteract the specific climate of the region, as many older architectural designs have been honed to deal with this. Simply adapting a tried and tested design with stronger materials and may be the best course of action.

Curved chhajja became popular in Mughal architecture particularly during and after the reign of Shah Jahan.

By the time that buildings like the Jahangiri Mahal at Agra and the palace complex at Fathpur Sikri were built, it emerged as a popular and important architectural element of Mughal architecture.

Later in the Mughal rule, buildings like the Zafar Mahal also illustrated a use for the chhajja for both practical and ornamental means.

Usage

Although chhajja are generally constructed in a manner which can be seen as aesthetically artistic, they have many usage cases in many different types of buildings.

Usage in Mughal Architecture

Despite initial Mughal built mosques not featuring chhajja, the Baburi (Babur style) mosque built in Ayodhya features eaves in the form of chhajja. After this, chhajja were not rare sight in mosque architecture within the Indian subcontinent, such as those within the mosques of Sirhind, where many of the arches are adorned with chhajja.

Although Mughal architecture is the dominant user of chhajja, lesser known constructions undertaken by the Maratha empire in occupied territory also features this such as in the architectural remains in Bahadurgarh, formally known as Saydabad. Despite the usual aesthetically eloquent chhajja constructions seen in Indian architecture, a more practical utilitarian version is used in forts as found in the remains at Bahadurgarh.

What appears to be chhajja also appears on fortifications in Mughal Sarai such as the one found at Doraha for both a practical and decorative purpose. Here, chhajja are seen in an elegant semi-hexagonal configuration. There is speculation that here there were more chhajja that have since crumbled.

Mahals and palaces were frequently built with extravagant artistic chhajja. This is seen in buildings such as the Zafar Mahal constructed during the late Mughal rule. This features a chhajja formed with multi-foliated arches resting on four baluster columns creating an extravagant appearance.

Chhajja and other architectural elements that supplement it appear mostly in buildings such as residential, administrative and formal buildings and pavilions. Much like on other ways of life, imperial builders possibly wished to represent a sincere desire to find emotional rapport with the local people through identifying with local architectural elements. This suggests chhajja have been used for longer than current standing structures would represent.

Modern Usage
Chhajja are seen in contemporary architecture where there have been attempts to replicate a traditional middle eastern or Indian subcontinent architectural style.

The common usage of chhajja is portrayed in the first two stanzas of Ashwini Magotra's 2004 poem "Lohri":

References 

Architecture in India
Mughal architecture elements
Architectural elements
Roofs
Islamic architectural elements